Arny Ross Roque-Banogon (born July 19, 1991), simply known as Arny Ross is a Filipino actress, comedian, model, and dancer. She is known as one of the contestants of Protégé: The Battle For The Big Artista Break under Gina Alajar and later to Phillip Salvador. She represented Southern Luzon in that season.

During Protégé, Ross developed a love interest with Jeric Gonzales, who ended up as the Grand Winner of the show. She was eliminated from the competition before the announcement of the final 10 contestants.

Ross is also known for being a mainstay of Bubble Gang until 2022 and she was a member of its group "Bubble Shakers".

Personal life
Ross was born in Dasmariñas, Cavite, to a Policewoman mother. When she studied at De La Salle University-Dasmariñas she became a great dancer, which became her stepping stone to fame. Before she joined Protégé, she participated in beauty pageants not only in her hometown, Dasmariñas and her Province, Cavite but also in Southern Luzon and National Pageants including Miss Teem Philippines and PRISAA, in which she eventually won. She also worked for Dasmariñas Rep. Elpidio Barzaga.

She is married to her longtime partner for 13 years, Frank Banogon on November 9, 2021 in Tagaytay. Ross gave birth to their first child named Jordan Franco on July 27, 2022.

Career
She became the cover girl of FHM Philippines for May 2015, in which she joined forces with social media sweethearts Ann B. Mateo and Cyen Lazam as the FHM May 2015 Online Babes. According to an episode of 24 Oras, all Bubble Shakers would perform on the 100 Sexiest Party dubbed as FHM BroCon on July 11, 2015 at the SMX Convention Center (SM Mall of Asia) but their rankings in the said list allegedly led them to boycott the event.

During Protégé: Season 2, Ross had a conflict with renowned actress-director Gina Alajar, alleging that the latter plays favoritism towards co-candidate Thea Tolentino. Her alleged childish attitude on the show was rumored to be the reason why she was eliminated from the competition. Thea Tolentino, on the other hand, emerged as the Grand Winner of the reality contest.

Filmography

Television

Discography

Awards and recognitions

FHM 100 Sexiest Woman

References

External links
 
 

1991 births
Living people
Participants in Philippine reality television series
Protégé (TV series) participants
GMA Network personalities
Filipino beauty pageant winners
Filipina gravure idols
People from Dasmariñas
Actresses from Cavite
Tagalog people